O'Donoghue's Opera is an Irish film starring Ronnie Drew and his bandmates in The Dubliners. The film is a mock opera, based on the ballad "The Night That Larry Was Stretched". It was shot in 1965, but was left uncompleted after the film's production ran into financial difficulties. In 1996 filmmaker Sé Merry Doyle of Loopline film oversaw its restoration, and it was first shown at the Dublin Film Festival in the late 1990s. Producer Seamus Byrne's first job in the film industry was on this film working with the assistant director and the art director.

References

1965 films
Irish independent films
English-language Irish films